The year 2010 is the 12th year in the history of King of the Cage, a mixed martial arts promotion based in the United States. In 2010 King of the Cage held 40 events, KOTC: Toryumon.

Title fights

Events list

KOTC: Toryumon

KOTC: Toryumon was an event held on January 30, 2010, at the Okinawa Convention Center in Okinawa, Japan.

Results

KOTC: Offensive Strategy

KOTC: Offensive Strategy was an event held on February 6, 2010, at the Northern Lights Casino in Walker, Minnesota.

Results

KOTC: Vengeance

KOTC: Vengeance was an event held on February 12, 2010, at the Inn of the Mountain Gods Resort and Casino in Mescalero, New Mexico.

Results

KOTC: Arrival

KOTC: Arrival was an event held on February 25, 2010, at the San Manuel Casino in Highland, California.

Results

KOTC: Starlight

KOTC: Starlight was an event held on February 27, 2010, at the Ute Mountain Casino in Cortez, Colorado.

Results

KOTC: Ice Age

KOTC: Ice Age was an event held on March 5, 2010, at the Shooting Star Casino in Mahnomen, Minnesota.

Results

KOTC: Native Warriors

KOTC: Native Warriors was an event held on March 6, 2010, at the Buffalo Thunder Resort and Casino in Santa Fe, New Mexico.

Results

KOTC: Upper Cut

KOTC: Upper Cut was an event held on March 13, 2010, at the Avi Resort and Casino in Laughlin, Nevada.

Results

KOTC: Legacy

KOTC: Legacy was an event held on March 26, 2010, at the Silver Legacy Resort Casino in Reno, Nevada. This event also featured the debut of the former two-time UFC Bantamweight Champion T.J Dillashaw

Results

KOTC: Bad Boys II

KOTC: Bad Boys II was an event held on April 16, 2010, at the Cobo Arena in Detroit, Michigan.

Results

KOTC: Underground 54

KOTC: Underground 54 was an event held on April 17, 2010, at the Leelanau Sands Casino in Peshawbestown, Michigan.

Results

KOTC: Turbulence 2

KOTC: Turbulence 2 was an event held on April 24, 2010, at the Lake of the Torches Casino in Lac du Flambeau, Wisconsin.

Results

KOTC: Underground 55

KOTC: Underground 55 was an event held on April 30, 2010, at the Jackpot Junction Casino Hotel in Morton, Minnesota.

Results

KOTC: Underground 56

KOTC: Underground 56 was an event held on May 8, 2010, at the Kewadin Casino in Sault Ste. Marie, Michigan.

Results

KOTC: Excessive Damage

KOTC: Excessive Damage was an event held on May 13, 2010, at the San Manuel Casino in Highland, California.

Results

KOTC: Honor

KOTC: Honor was an event held on May 14, 2010, at the Inn of the Mountain Gods Resort and Casino in Mescalero, New Mexico.

Results

KOTC: Underground 57

KOTC: Underground 57 was an event held on May 22, 2010, at the Ute Recreation Center in Towaoc, Colorado.

Results

KOTC: Adrenaline

KOTC: Adrenaline was an event held on June 4, 2010, at the Buffalo Thunder Resort and Casino in Santa Fe, New Mexico.

Results

KOTC: Underground 58

KOTC: Underground 58 was an event held on June 5, 2010, at the Quinault Gods Resort and Casino in Ocean Shores, Washington.

Results

KOTC: Tropical Storm

KOTC: Tropical Storm was an event held on July 10, 2010, at the Storm Stadium in Lake Elsinore, California.

Results

KOTC: Chain Reaction

KOTC: Chain Reaction was an event held on July 17, 2010, at the Lake of the Torches Casino in Lac du Flambeau, Wisconsin.

Results

KOTC: Underground 59

KOTC: Underground 59 was an event held on July 31, 2010, at the Storm Stadium in Lake Elsinore, California.

Results

KOTC: Sniper

KOTC: Sniper was an event held on August 5, 2010, at the San Manuel Casino in San Bernardino, California.

Results

KOTC: Imminent Danger

KOTC: Imminent Danger was an event held on August 13, 2010, at the Inn of the Mountain Gods Casino in Mescalero, New Mexico.

Results

KOTC: Underground 60

KOTC: Underground 60 was an event held on August 14, 2010, at the Kewadin Casino in Sault Ste Marie, Michigan.

Results

KOTC: Underground 61

KOTC: Underground 61 was an event held on August 28, 2010, at the Leelanau Sands Casino in Peshawbestown, Michigan.

Results

KOTC: Civil War 2

KOTC: Civil War 2 was an event held on September 11, 2010, at the Royal Oak Music Theatre in Royal Oak, Michigan.

Results

KOTC: No Mercy

KOTC: No Mercy was an event held on September 17, 2010, at the MGM Grand Casino at Foxwoods in Mashantucket, Connecticut.

Results

KOTC: Underground 62

KOTC: Underground 62 was an event held on September 18, 2010, at the Ute Mountain Casino in Cortez, Colorado.

Results

KOTC: Underground 63

KOTC: Underground 63 was an event held on October 2, 2010, at the Avi Casino in Laughlin, Nevada.

Results

KOTC: Inferno

KOTC: Inferno was an event held on October 7, 2010, at the San Manuel Casino in Highland, California.

Results

KOTC: High Profile

KOTC: High Profile was an event held on October 9, 2010, at the Lake of the Torches Casino in Lac Du Flambeau, Wisconsin.

Results

KOTC: Free Fall

KOTC: Free Fall was an event held on October 23, 2010, at the Northern Lights Casino in Walker, Minnesota.

Results

KOTC: Mainstream

KOTC: Mainstream was an event held on October 29, 2010, at the Jackpot Junction Casino in Morton, Minnesota.

Results

KOTC: Underground 64

KOTC: Underground 64 was an event held on November 6, 2010, at the Kewadin Casino in Sault Ste Marie, Michigan.

Results

KOTC: Infusion

KOTC: Infusion was an event held on November 13, 2010, at the Eastside Cannery Casino and Hotel in Las Vegas, Nevada.

Results

KOTC: Platinum

KOTC: Platinum was an event held on November 25, 2010, at the Durban International Convention Centre in Durban, South Africa.

Results

KOTC: Zero Tolerance

KOTC: Zero Tolerance was an event held on November 27, 2010, at the Inn of the Mountain Gods Resort and Casino in Mescalero, New Mexico.

Results

KOTC: Steel

KOTC: Steel was an event held on December 9, 2010, at the San Manuel Casino in San Bernardino, California.

Results

See also 
 List of King of the Cage events
 List of King of the Cage champions

References

King of the Cage events
2010 in mixed martial arts